The Beverly Hills Film Festival (BHFF) is a film festival in the United States founded in 2001 by independent filmmaker Nino Simone.  The festival is an international competition dedicated to showcasing the art and talent of emerging filmmakers and screenplay writers from around the world.

The festival lasts five days and is reportedly attended by more than 20,000 people a year. Venues include the AMPAS, Writers Guild, Chinese Theater and The Clarity Theatre. The festival winds up with the  black tie awards ceremony. In 2013 the festival was launched internationally with an event in Tokyo.

The BHFF emphasizes awards to first-time filmmakers. On the final night of the Festival, the jury (usually made up of film professionals from all over the globe) presents its awards, including the Golden Palm Award for best picture, at a black-tie gala at the Four Seasons Beverly Wilshire Hotel.

The Beverly Hills Film Festival has officially canceled its 2020 event due to ongoing COVID-19 concerns and lockdown orders. “Due to the fact that the Beverly Hills Film Festival will bring together thousands of attendees locally and globally, it is our ethical and moral responsibility to not participate in the possible outbreak of COVID-19,” organizers said in a statement.

References

External links

Film festivals in Los Angeles
Film Festival
Film festivals established in 2001
2001 establishments in California